Nikolay Mikhailovich Afanasyev (14 November 1916 – 15 March 2009), also known as Nicolai Michaelovich Afanasiev, was a Russian firearms designer.

Biography
Nicolai Michaelovitch Afanasiev was born in Russia on 14 November 1916 in St. Petersburg. In 1938 he graduated from a Tekhnikum of the Mechanization of Agriculture.

In 1939 he was drafted to serve in a tank corps in Mongolia, where he started to work on machine gun design. After the Nazi invasion of the Soviet Union, he volunteered for front-line service. He was allowed to be a fighter from September 1941 until the fall of 1942, when he was recalled to work on armaments, initially on improving fuses for 82- and 120-mm mortars.

After 1948 Afanasiev worked at the KBP Instrument Design Bureau.

He died on 15 March 2009.

Designs
 LAD machine gun – 1942
 Afanasev A-12.7 – 1950
 Afanasev Makarov AM-23 – 1953
 a bullpup design with which he participated in the AKM contest - 1955
 2A-14 23 mm autocannon, used in the ZU-23 – 1960 (with P.G. Yakushev)
 2A-7 23 mm autocannon, used in the ZSU-23-4 – 1960 (with P.G. Yakushev)
 TKB-011
 TKB-0136, competed in Project Abakan
 OTs-02 Kiparis

Honours and awards
 Hero of Socialist Labour (1986) – For achievements in the design of aircraft gun armament
 Two Orders of Lenin (1963, 1986)
 Order of the October Revolution (1977)
 Order of the Patriotic War, 2nd class (1963)
 USSR State Prize (1967)
 Mosin Prize
 Honoured Inventor of the RSFSR (1968)

References

External links
 http://www.bratishka.ru/archiv/2007/8/2007_8_17.php  
 Photo of Afanasyev's small arms designs at Tula museum
  Николай Михайлович Афанасьев page at KBP



1916 births
2009 deaths
Firearm designers
Heroes of Socialist Labour
Engineers from Saint Petersburg
Recipients of the Order of Lenin
Recipients of the USSR State Prize
Soviet inventors
Soviet engineers
Soviet military personnel of World War II